Thomas Deacon,  (November 7, 1832 – March 18, 1911) was an Ontario lawyer, judge, businessman and political figure. He represented Renfrew North in the Legislative Assembly of Ontario from 1871 to 1879.

He was born in Perth in Upper Canada in 1832, the son of John Deacon, an Irish immigrant. He studied law with his brother John, was called to the bar in 1862 and went on to practice in Pembroke. Deacon married Caroline Rebecca Dunlop in 1864. He was named Queen's Counsel in 1876. He served as a member of the town council. Deacon was a director of the Kingston and Pembroke Railway and president of a lumber company. He was named judge in Renfrew County in 1895. Deacon was also county master for the Orange Order. He died in 1911 in Pembroke.

Deacon, a geographic township in Nipissing District, was named after him.

References

External links 

The Canadian men and women of the time : a handbook of Canadian biography, HJ Morgan (1898)
Nothing but Names, HF Gardner (1899)

1832 births
1911 deaths
Canadian judges
Canadian Methodists
Canadian King's Counsel
People from Pembroke, Ontario
Progressive Conservative Party of Ontario MPPs
19th-century Canadian judges
19th-century Canadian lawyers